Lawrence "Larry" Canning (1 November 1925 – 6 April 2012) was a Scottish footballer who played for Aston Villa during the 1940s and 1950s, then later served on the board.

Death
On 6 April 2012, Canning died as a result of vascular dementia – aged 86.

References

External links
Larry Canning career stats at AstonVillaPlayerDatabase.com

1925 births
2012 deaths
People from Cowdenbeath
Deaths from vascular dementia
Scottish footballers
Association football midfielders
Aston Villa F.C. players
Kettering Town F.C. players
Northampton Town F.C. players
Nuneaton Borough F.C. players
English Football League players
Deaths from dementia in England
Paget Rangers F.C. players